Korp! may refer to:
 Korp! Leola
 Korp! Revelia
 Korp! Sakala
 Korp! Vironia

See also 
 League of Estonian Corporations